The Battle of Pozo Almonte was an engagement fought during the Chilean Civil War of 1891 between Balmacedist and Congressional forces on 6 March 1891. The Congressional victory eventually led the junta gaining control of all of northern Chile.

References

Bibliography 
 Francisco Antonio Encina & Leopoldo Castedo (2006). Historia de Chile. Balmaceda y la Guerra Civil. Tomo IX. Santiago de Chile: Editorial Santiago. .

Conflicts in 1891
1891 in Chile
Battles involving Chile
Battle of Pozo Almonte
March 1891 events